BGP stands for Border Gateway Protocol, an Internet protocol.

BGP may also stand for:
 β-glycerophosphate, a phosphatase inhibitor
 Balanced Growth Path, a steady state solution for some economic growth models
 Brawn GP, a Formula One motor racing team
 Bandwidth guaranteed polling, an Ethernet bandwidth allocation algorithm
 Presidential Guard Battalion (Brazil), honor guard to the President of Brazil
 Blue Gene/P supercomputer
 Basic graph patterns, from computer science